Ahmad ibn Muhammad Ardabili was a Shia Grand Ayatollah of jurisprudence. After the death of Zayn al-Din al-Juba'i al'Amili, he became the Marja' of the Twelver Shia in Najaf, Iraq. He is known by the titles of Mohaghegh and Muoghaddas.

Life and education
Ahmad was born in the Safavid era (16th century) in Ardabil, Azerbaijan in Iran. He moved to Najaf and continued his education. He moved to Shiraz to study philosophy under Jamal al-Din Mahmud, a student of Jalaladdin Davani. Mohaghegh studied intellectual sciences and Fiqh in the seminary of Najaf. He gave up teaching intellectual subjects during the last years of his life and taught narrative sciences at Najaf. The seminary of Najaf  thrived under his management.

Titles 
Ahmad ibn Muhammad Ardabili was called Mohaghegh (researcher) by other scholars because of his skills. He was also called Moghaddas (saint) by those close to him.

Moghaddas Ardabili and Safavid dynasty
The Safavid dynasty sent a message by Bahāʾ al-dīn al-ʿĀmilī and requested Ardabili to move to Iran from Najaf. Although, he refused Shah Abbas Safavi's request to move to Iran, he remained connected with the Safavid court. He resolved problems of Shiites by writing letters to the Safavid kings. He also played an important role in spreading Shia religion during the Safavid era.

Scholarly works
Mohaghegh Ardabili wrote scholarly works on Fiqh, the intellectual sciences, Principles of Islamic jurisprudence, theology, and Ahl al-Bayt's life. He also wrote one of the major Shia Quran commentaries. He wrote several books in Persian as Proof of the Imamah, Proof of the Vejeb, Manasek of Hajj. His works include
 Zubdat al-Bayan fi Ayat al-Ahkam, a treatise about the juridical verses of the Quran. 
 Majma al-Faedeh val-Borhan fi Sharh al-Adhhan, an encyclopedia of inferential jurisprudence. 
 Estynas al-manawiyyah
 Bahr al-Manaqib.

Death 

Ahmad ibn Muhammad Ardabili died in 1585 (993 AH) and was buried in Imam Ali Mosque in Najaf.

Legacy 
In 1978, University of Mohaghegh Ardabili (UMA) was established in Ardabil and named in honour of Ahmad ibn Muhammad Ardabili.

See also

 University of Mohaghegh Ardabili

References

External links 
 Zubdat al-bayan fi ahkam al-Quràn in Google books

Iranian grand ayatollahs
People from Ardabil
Muslim scholars of Islamic jurisprudence
16th-century writers of Safavid Iran
1585 deaths
Iranian expatriates in the Ottoman Empire
16th-century births
Burials at Imam Ali Mosque
Iranian Muslim mystics